In the mathematical field of graph theory, a quartic graph is a graph where all vertices have degree 4. In other words, a quartic graph is a 4-regular graph.

Examples

Several well-known graphs are quartic. They include:
The complete graph K5, a quartic graph with 5 vertices, the smallest possible quartic graph.
The Chvátal graph, another quartic graph with 12 vertices, the smallest quartic graph that both has no triangles and cannot be colored with three colors.
The Folkman graph, a quartic graph with 20 vertices, the smallest semi-symmetric graph.
The Meredith graph, a quartic graph with 70 vertices that is 4-connected but has no Hamiltonian cycle, disproving a conjecture of Crispin Nash-Williams.

Every medial graph is a quartic plane graph, and every quartic plane graph is the medial graph of a pair of dual plane graphs or multigraphs. Knot diagrams and link diagrams are also quartic plane multigraphs, in which the vertices represent the crossings of the diagram and are marked with additional information concerning which of the two branches of the knot crosses the other branch at that point.

Properties
Because the degree of every vertex in a quartic graph is even, every connected quartic graph has an Euler tour.
And as with regular bipartite graphs more generally, every bipartite quartic graph has a perfect matching. In this case, a much simpler and faster algorithm for finding such a matching is possible than for irregular graphs: by selecting every other edge of an Euler tour, one may find a 2-factor, which in this case must be a collection of cycles, each of even length, with each vertex of the graph appearing in exactly one cycle.  By selecting every other edge again in these cycles, one obtains a perfect matching in linear time. The same method can also be used to color the edges of the graph with four colors in linear time.

Quartic graphs have an even number of Hamiltonian decompositions.

Open problems
It is an open conjecture whether all quartic Hamiltonian graphs have an even number of Hamiltonian circuits, or have more than one Hamiltonian circuit. The answer is known to be false for quartic multigraphs.

See also 

 Cubic graph

References

External links

Graph families
Regular graphs